Korbinian Holzer (born 16 February 1988) is a German professional ice hockey defenceman currently playing for Adler Mannheim of the Deutsche Eishockey Liga (DEL). He previously played for the Anaheim Ducks, Nashville Predators, and Toronto Maple Leafs of the National Hockey League (NHL).

Playing career
Holzer was drafted in the fourth round, 111th overall, of the 2006 NHL Entry Draft by the Toronto Maple Leafs. Drafted from playing in his native Germany with EC Bad Tölz, he made his debut in the top Deutsche Eishockey Liga (DEL) with the DEG Metro Stars.

Holzer began the 2010–11 season with the Maple Leafs' American Hockey League (AHL) affiliate, the Toronto Marlies. On 3 November 2010, he was recalled from the minors to make his NHL debut on 6 November 2010.

In the 2012–13 season, Holzer was recalled by the Maple Leafs on 5 February 2013 and scored his first NHL goal on just the fourth shot of his NHL career, his point slap shot beating Michal Neuvirth of the Washington Capitals. The Leafs ended up winning the game 3–2.

In the 2014–15 season, on 6 October 2014, the Maple Leafs waived Holzer. Unclaimed, he was later returned to the Toronto Marlies on 15 November. The Maple Leafs recalled Holzer on an emergency, only to send him back down to the Marlies on 16 November. One week later, Holzer was recalled and remained with the Leafs to replace injured defenceman Roman Polák. On 2 March 2015, Holzer was traded by the re-tooling Maple Leafs to the Anaheim Ducks in exchange for defenceman Eric Brewer and a fifth-round pick in the 2016 NHL Entry Draft (traded to Washington Capitals).

On 26 June 2017, Holzer continued his tenure with the Ducks by agreeing to a two-year contract extension.

On 20 June 2019, Holzer agreed to continue to return for his fifth season within the Ducks organization after he was re-signed to a one-year $850,000 contract extension. In the following 2019–20 season, Holzer remained on the Ducks roster, establishing a regular third-pairing role on blueline. In a career-high 46 games with the Ducks, Holzer added 1 goal and 4 points.

With the Ducks out of playoff contention at the NHL trade deadline, Holzer was traded by Anaheim to the Nashville Predators in exchange for Matt Irwin and a 2022 sixth-round draft pick on 24 February 2020. Holzer made three regular-season appearances with the Predators before the season was paused due to the COVID-19 pandemic. Returning to the club for the post-season, Holzer was a healthy scratch in their qualifying series defeat to the Arizona Coyotes.

On 1 November 2020, Holzer as a free agent, left the NHL and was belatedly signed to a one-year contract with Russian outfit, Avtomobilist Yekaterinburg of the Kontinental Hockey League (KHL). In the 2020–21 season, Holzer was limited to 25 regular season games on the blueline with Avtomobilist, contributing with 1 goal and 4 points. He made five playoff appearances, registering two assists, before leaving the KHL at the conclusion of his contract.

On 7 May 2021, Holzer returned to his native Germany as a free agent, securing a two-year contract with Adler Mannheim of the DEL.

International play
Holzer has represented the Germany national team in the 2010 Winter Olympics and 2010 IIHF World Championship. He also represented Germany at the 2018 IIHF World Championship, 2019 IIHF World Championship, and the 2021 IIHF World Championship.

On 25 January 2022, Holzer was selected to play for Team Germany at the 2022 Winter Olympics.

Career statistics

Regular season and playoffs

International

Awards and honours

References

External links
 

1988 births
Living people
Adler Mannheim players
Anaheim Ducks players
Avtomobilist Yekaterinburg players
EC Bad Tölz players
DEG Metro Stars players
German expatriates in Canada
German expatriate sportspeople in Canada
German expatriate sportspeople in the United States
German ice hockey defencemen
Ice hockey players at the 2010 Winter Olympics
Nashville Predators players
Olympic ice hockey players of Germany
San Diego Gulls (AHL) players
Sportspeople from Munich
Toronto Maple Leafs draft picks
Toronto Maple Leafs players
Toronto Marlies players
Ice hockey players at the 2022 Winter Olympics